FOTY may refer to:

 Footballer of the Year (disambiguation)
 Ring Magazine fights of the year